Gillian Elizabeth Robertson (born May 17, 1995) is a Canadian mixed martial artist (MMA). She currently competes in the Flyweight division in the  Ultimate Fighting Championship (UFC).

Background
Robertson was born in Niagara Falls, Ontario, Canada. She started cardio kickboxing training at the age of 16 at American Top Team. She then joined MMA classes after a few months and started competing two years later.

Mixed martial arts career

Early career 
Robertson started her professional MMA career since 2016 after amassed a record of 9–1 in amateur fights. After fighting in five professional bouts she participated in The Ultimate Fighter 26 UFC TV mma competition series and was subsequently signed by the UFC after the show.

The Ultimate Fighter
In August 2017, it was announced that Robertson was one of the fighters featured on The Ultimate Fighter 26, UFC TV series, where the process to crown the UFC's inaugural 125-pound women's champion will take place.

In the preliminary fights, Robertson faced Barb Honchak and lost the fight via TKO in the second round.

Ultimate Fighting Championship
Robertson made her UFC debut on December 1, 2017, on The Ultimate Fighter 26 Finale against Emily Whitmire. She won the fight via a submission in round one.

Her next fight came on May 27, 2018, at UFC Fight Night: Thompson vs. Till against Molly McCann. At the weigh-ins, McCann weighed in at 127 pounds, 1 pound over the flyweight non-title fight limit of 126. She was fined 20 percent of her purse, which went to Robertson. She won the fight via a rear-naked choke in round two.

On September 22, 2018, Robertson faced Mayra Bueno Silva at UFC Fight Night: Santos vs. Anders. She lost the fight via a submission in round one.

Robertson faced Veronica Macedo on February 23, 2019, at UFC Fight Night: Błachowicz vs. Santos. She won the fight via submission in the second round.

Robertson faced Sarah Frota on July 27, 2019, at UFC 240. She won the fight via technical knockout in round two.

In the lead up to the Frota fight, Robertson would begin training with Jose Torres and coach Din Thomas at ATT. This was beginning of their partnership once Thomas and the two fighters left ATT.

Robertson faced Maycee Barber on October 18, 2019, at UFC on ESPN 6. She lost the fight via technical knockout in round one.

Robertson was expected to face Taila Santos on June 20, 2020, at UFC Fight Night: Blaydes vs. Volkov. Due to undisclosed reasons, Robertson's opponent changed and she instead faced Cortney Casey. She won the fight via a rear-naked choke submission in round three.

Ahead of her fight with Botelho, Robertson was given her black belt in Brazilian Jiu Jitsu by coach Din Thomas. Robertson described the event as emotional and joyous after nine years of work.

During the COVID-19 pandemic Robertson left American Top Team with her head coach, Din Thomas and teammate Jose Torres.

Robertson faced Poliana Botelho on October 18, 2020 at UFC Fight Night 180. She won the fight via unanimous decision.

Robertson was scheduled to face Andrea Lee on December 12, 2020, at UFC 256.  However, Lee pulled out in early December due to a broken nose and Robertson faced Taila Santos instead at UFC Fight Night: Thompson vs. Neal. Robertson lost the fight via unanimous decision.

Robertson was next expected to face Miranda Maverick at UFC 258 on February 13, 2021. However, hours before the fight, Robertson had a non-COVID related illness and the bout was cancelled. The pair eventually was reschedule to UFC 260 on March 27, 2021. Robertson lost the fight via unanimous decision.

Robertson faced Priscila Cachoeira on December 11, 2021, at UFC 269. At the weigh-ins, Cachoeira weighed in at 129 pounds, three pounds over the flyweight non-title fight limit. The bout proceeded at catchweight with Cachoeira fined 30% of her purse, which went to Robertson. Robertson won the fight via a rear-naked choke submission in the first round.

Robertson faced JJ Aldrich, replacing Ariane Lipski, on March 12, 2022, at UFC Fight Night 203. She lost the fight via unanimous decision.

Robertson was scheduled to face Melissa Gatto on September 17, 2022, at UFC Fight Night 210.
However, Gatto was removed from the event for undisclosed reasons, and she was replaced by Mariya Agapova.  Robertson won the fight via rear-naked choke.

Robertson is scheduled to face Piera Rodríguez on April 15, 2023, at UFC on ESPN 44.

Professional grappling career

Robertson has competed for the professional grappling promotion Submission Underground on several occasions while her MMA career was ongoing. At SUG 17 on August 30, 2020, she faced Amanda Loewen and lost by armbar in EBI overtime. She returned at SUG 20 for the promotion's end of year event on December 30, 2020, and submitted Pearl Gonzalez with a rear-naked choke inside regulation time. At SUG 22 on April 25, 2021, Robertson faced Liz Tracy and was lost by armbar in EBI overtime. She then returned at SUG 23 on May 23, 2021, where she faced top BJJ competitor Raquel Canuto and was submitted with a guillotine in regulation time. At SUG 26 on August 15, 2021, Robertson faced fellow UFC veteran Katlyn Chookagian and won by fastest escape time in EBI overtime.

Robertson also took part in a bantamweight Combat Jiu-Jitsu tournament at Medusa 1 on October 2, 2021, getting submitted with a kneebar in the opening round by Nikki Sullivan. She faced Chrissy Briggs in a grappling match on the preliminary card of Fury Pro Grappling 3 on December 30, 2021, winning a unanimous decision victory. Robertson returned to the promotion at Fury Pro Grappling 6 to face former UFC strawweight world champion Rose Namajunas in the main event, submitting her with a rear-naked choke in 65 seconds.

Championships and accomplishments

Mixed martial arts
Ultimate Fighting Championship
Most finishes in UFC Women's Flyweight division history (7)
Most submission wins in UFC Women's history (6)
Most submission wins in UFC Women's Flyweight division history (6)
Tied (Katlyn Chookagian) for most fights in UFC Women's Flyweight division history (13)
Third most wins in UFC Women's Flyweight division history (8)

Mixed martial arts record

|-
|Win
|align=center|11–7
|Mariya Agapova
|Technical Submission (rear-naked choke)
|UFC Fight Night: Sandhagen vs. Song 
|
|align=center|2
|align=center|2:19
|Las Vegas, Nevada, United States
|
|-
|Loss
|align=center|10–7
|JJ Aldrich
|Decision (unanimous)
|UFC Fight Night: Santos vs. Ankalaev
|
|align=center|3
|align=center|5:00
|Las Vegas, Nevada, United States
|
|-
|Win
|align=center|10–6
|Priscila Cachoeira
|Submission (rear-naked choke)
|UFC 269
|
|align=center|1
|align=center|4:59
|Las Vegas, Nevada, United States
|
|-
|Loss
|align=center|9–6
|Miranda Maverick
|Decision (unanimous)
|UFC 260 
|
|align=center|3
|align=center|5:00
|Las Vegas, Nevada, United States
|
|-
|Loss
|align=center|9–5
|Taila Santos
|Decision (unanimous)
|UFC Fight Night: Thompson vs. Neal
|
|align=center|3
|align=center|5:00
|Las Vegas, Nevada, United States
|
|-
|Win
|align=center|9–4
|Poliana Botelho
|Decision (unanimous)
|UFC Fight Night: Ortega vs. The Korean Zombie 
|
|align=center|3
|align=center|5:00
|Abu Dhabi, United Arab Emirates
|  
|-
|Win
|align=center|8–4
|Cortney Casey
|Submission (rear-naked choke)
|UFC on ESPN: Blaydes vs. Volkov 
|
|align=center|3
|align=center|4:36
|Las Vegas, Nevada, United States
|
|-
| Loss
|align=center|7–4
|Maycee Barber
|TKO (punches)
|UFC on ESPN: Reyes vs. Weidman
|
|align=center|1
|align=center|3:04
|Boston, Massachusetts, United States
|
|-
| Win
|align=center|7–3
|Sarah Frota
|TKO (elbows)
|UFC 240 
|
|align=center|2
|align=center|4:13
|Edmonton, Alberta, Canada
|
|-
| Win
| align=center| 6–3
| Veronica Macedo
| Submission (rear naked choke)
| UFC Fight Night: Błachowicz vs. Santos
| 
| align=center| 2
| align=center| 3:27
| Prague, Czech Republic
| 
|-
|Loss
|align=center| 5–3
|Mayra Bueno Silva
|Submission (armbar)
|UFC Fight Night: Santos vs. Anders
|
|align=center| 1
|align=center| 4:55
|São Paulo, Brazil
|
|-
|Win
|align=center| 5–2
|Molly McCann
|Technical Submission (rear-naked choke)
|UFC Fight Night: Thompson vs. Till
|
|align=center| 2
|align=center| 2:05
|Liverpool, England
|
|-
|Win
|align=center| 4–2
|Emily Whitmire
|Submission (armbar)
|The Ultimate Fighter: A New World Champion Finale
|
|align=center| 1
|align=center| 2:12
|Las Vegas, Nevada, United States
|
|-
|Win
|align=center| 3–2
|Hannah Cifers
|Submission (rear-naked choke)
|Next Level Fight Club 7
|
|align=center| 2
|align=center| 4:12
|Raleigh, North Carolina, United States
|
|-
|Loss
|align=center|  2–2
|Cynthia Calvillo
|Decision (unanimous)
|Global Knockout 8
|
|align=center| 3
|align=center| 3:00
|Jackson, California, United States
|
|-
|Win
|align=center| 2–1
|Miki Rogers
|Submission (armbar)
|Atlas Fights 29
|
|align=center| 1
|align=center| 4:16
|Biloxi, Mississippi, United States
|
|-
|Win
|align=center| 1–1
|Monica Medina
||Decision (unanimous)
|FFI: Blood and Sand 20
|
|align=center| 3
|align=center| 3:00
|Biloxi, Mississippi, United States
|
|-
|Loss
|align=center| 0–1
|Hannah Goldy
|Decision (unanimous)
|Square Ring Promotions: Island Fights 37
|
|align=center| 3
|align=center| 3:00
|Pensacola, Florida, United States
|
|-

|-
| Loss
| align=center | 0–1
| Barb Honchak
| TKO (punches and elbows)	
|rowspan=2| The Ultimate Fighter: A New World Champion
|  (air date)
| align=Center | 2
| align=center | 2:27
|rowspan=2| Las Vegas, Nevada, United States
|

Submission grappling record

See also
List of current UFC fighters
List of female mixed martial artists
List of Canadian UFC fighters

References

External links
 
 

Living people
1995 births
Sportspeople from Niagara Falls, Ontario
Flyweight mixed martial artists
Mixed martial artists utilizing kickboxing
Mixed martial artists utilizing Brazilian jiu-jitsu
Canadian practitioners of Brazilian jiu-jitsu
People awarded a black belt in Brazilian jiu-jitsu
Female Brazilian jiu-jitsu practitioners
Canadian female mixed martial artists
Ultimate Fighting Championship female fighters